The Tsamai people (also spelled Tsemay, Tsamay, Tsemai, Tsamako, or Tsamakko) are an ethnic group of southwestern Ethiopia. They speak a Cushitic language called Tsamai, which is one of the Dullay languages, and thus related to the Bussa and Gawwada languages.

The tribe is characterized and identified by its colors – blue, black, white and red. The colors are mostly expressed by jewelry. These colors are used to identify the tribe, decided upon by elders of the tribe.

According to the 1998 Ethiopian census, the Tsamai number 9,702. The number of speakers of the Tsamai language is 8,621, with 5,298 monolinguals. Many Tsamai use the Konso language for trade purposes.

Many Tsamai women wear clothing made from leather. Many Tsamai men carry small stools around with them, which they use in case they need to sit down.

They have a very low level of literacy: below 1% in their first language and 2.8% in their second language.

The Tsamai live in an area that is frequented by adventure tours, and thus are a frequently photographed people.

Geography 
Most Tsamai live in the Bena Tsemay woreda of the Debub Omo Zone of the Southern Nations, Nationalities, and People's Region, in the Lower Omo River Valley and just to the west of the Konso special woreda. Many Tsamai live in the town of Weyto, which is approximately 50 km from the town of Jinka, on the Konso-Jinka road.

Other Tribal families live in villages scattered throughout central areas, such as “Shalla” (meaning: attic), “Gone (in the mountains),” “Ollo (characterized by windy, narrow and sometimes slippery mountainous agricultural areas),” “Dulayko.” The nearest town to this area is Key Afer.

History 
A tribe of people, now called Tsamai, split off from the Ale tribe, traveled many miles, and decided to cross the Weyto River. The tribe spread over a large area and split into 7 additional groups, each occupying its own land area. The name of each group is on the first name of the oldest man in it at that point in time. The most respected and largest family is called Aezmatako, after the oldest man of all the seven at the time. Members of this group are also the oldest hunters. Beyond that are also: Barito, Helako, Amadoo.

The meaning of the name “Tsamai” is not clear, but some tribe members believe it means “the most active brother.”

Construction 
The Tsamai live in thatched huts. There are modest houses and large houses. Some are surrounded by branches and gates, some on agricultural land. Most of the houses have an outdoor courtyard used for various housework errands such as separating Moringa leaves from branches and agricultural activities such as collecting and concentrating corn or sorghum. These courtyards may also be used for rest and leisure.

Building Process 
After the man collects wood for the house and straw for the roof, a process that takes about a year, the woman makes a lot of beer and many people gather to help build the house while drinking. When the house is in the mountainous fields, a flat surface should be created. The women and men help together in building the house and establishing the agricultural lands. Usually it takes three days to finish the job. Around most of the houses there is a wooden fence, and between the house and the fence there is open land.

Types of Houses 
There are two main types of houses: 

 Round – The walls are made of twelve strong and thick logs, about 10-15 cm diameter and length of one and a half meters. These thicker logs act as structure, but among them are thinner logs as well. At a height of about a meter and a half begins an attic, resembling a ceiling, made of flat wood. The triangular roof is made of special leaves. When entering the house on the left can be found a slightly elevated sleeping surface (about 15-30 cm) with skins for comfort. On the right, there is a fire area – 3 stones on which a pot is placed. The floors are low, less than 160cm tall, and a shelf which acts as an attic above. Some items found in a Tsamai house include magic accessories, soaps, and chlorine for water purification. There are animal skins used for sleeping or sitting. Behind the wooden wall is a storage area for grains. They also hang calabash fruit, which is used for bowls. In the attic, they store food products such as meat from yesterday, cereals, etc. In front of the fire will be a wide inverted squash, or a tree on which the women sit on while cooking.
 Rectangular – Because the small trees that make up the walls are not found in the Dulayko area, the locals build houses with strong trees in a rectangular shape. The roofs of these houses are flat and built of trees, many special leaves, and soil. The locals tend to sleep on the roof because the air there is fresh and cool and to avoid mosquitoes. The children sometimes sleep inside the house, on a bed made of wooden planks at ground level or half a meter above the ground. Sleeping will always be on skins. The empty land outside the house is used for sitting, resting, doing household chores such as separating the corn kernels from the cobs, burning another fire, cutting a pumpkin, and so on. In front of the fire, where there is a cooking pot stabilized on 3 stones, a wide inverted calabash will be placed, or a tree on which the women will sit and cook. In the fire area, cloths will be placed for pouring food and drink.

Furniture and Utensils 
In their houses there are some kinds of furniture and utensils:

 Pot lids are waved on the fire to oxygenate and increase the flame while cooking.
 In general, there is a device with holes and a stick that is quickly rubbed to create a fire.
 Low stools with 3 legs are commonly found as seating devices.
 Stumps are used for sitting closer to the fire.
 Hangers for calabash are constructed of a wooden pillar with three branches.

Agriculture, Diet, and Medicinal Plants 
Most Tsamai are agro-pastoralists, herding cattle as well as growing crops.

Tsamai people are farmers and breeders of livestock, such as goats, sheep, cows, and oxen. They use a variety of farm buildings, including chicken coops, raised from the ground for protection, and fenced-in areas for keeping and protecting herds of livestock. They grow sorghum, corn (maize), wheat, pumpkin, Moringa trees, some bananas, cherry tomatoes, and pumpkins. The Tsamai people are selling their products in the local markets if they need money.

Food 
Honey - The locals place “hives” in the tall trees. The “hives” are elliptical baskets open on both sides. At night, with the help of a burning torch, taken as a branch from the campfire, one of the men climbs up to the “hive”, smokes the “hive” so that the bees do not sting, and take out the honeycombs into a calabash in his hand. Sometimes they eat the honeycomb as it is, even with the larvae inside, because they contain protein, according to the locals. Sometimes “honey tea” will be prepared, as detailed under the above heading in the “drinking” chapter.

Meat - The locals slaughter and eat goat, veal, sheep, mutton, cows, lamb, and oxen. They will not eat chicken meat, usually because of the cleaning effort and the meats taste. Sheep and goat will be slaughtered for guests, and cows only during ceremonies. 

Handling of the animals, from slaughtering to cooking, will mostly be done by men. After the killing, and the removal of the blood, the skin will be separated from the meat and dried so that it will be used in the future as seating, sleeping, or clothing pads. After the slaughter, the locals will also eat the internal parts such as liver, kidneys, brain, and stomach. The men will impale the animal’s legs and chest on sticks they have sharpened with their knives and place next to the fire. Sometimes they will eat the meat well cooked, and other times when slightly raw. Meat which is not consumed will be kept in the attic for another meal. For example, if they slaughtered and dined in the evening, the remains would be heated in the morning fire and eaten as breakfast.

After the killing, and the removal of the blood (see the section under the heading “drinking”), the skin will be separated from the meat and dried so that it will be used in the future as seating, sleeping, or clothing pads. After the slaughter, the locals will also eat the internal parts such as liver, kidneys, brain, and stomach. The men will impale the animal’s legs and chest on sticks they have sharpened with their knives and place next to the fire. Sometimes they will eat the meat well cooked, and other times when slightly raw.

Chicken eggs - Will be cooked hard boiled, and served sometimes with something spicy.

Grains (wheat, sorghum), corn, and bread - 

Corn – The tribesmen separate some of the outer leaves that wrap the cob and cook on the fire until ready. Sometimes they eat it this way, and sometimes the women separate the kernels from the cob and serve them in a calabash.

Sorghum, corn or wheat grains: the women separate the grains from the stalks / cobs, dry, and grind them into a flour using a stone 15 cm wide and 40 cm long, standing on small stones sloping down from the woman’s body, and with the help of another stone 15 cm long but easy to handle – the women grind the flour. When finished, they will be mixed with water, and will shape and bake the dough in 2 possible ways:

 “Pita”, usually not made every day. Made of wheat. The women will place a stone plate 2 fingers thick on to the fire. When the hotplate boils to such an extent that drops of water evaporate when they hit, she spreads an especially liquid dough two cm thick with her hands, which she wets repeatedly with water. When the dough is baked, she applies water on top so that it doesn’t stick, and turns it with a stick so that the other side is baked. When the pita is ready, it is transferred to a large calabash. The excess dough is cleaned off with a stick and they continue to bake more pita.
 Dumplings – This method of preparation is much more common, and usually the dumplings will remain good to eat for several days. The women will prepare a batter that is less liquid than the pita bread based on the sorghum grain. With one hand, the woman will compress the dough, mold and pop it into the shape of a small banana. She will place the dumplings she made into a pot of hot water along with leaves and pieces of wood from a special plant that prevents them from breaking down (melting) and sticking.

Other ways to eat sorghum – They will eat the fresh grains straight from the plant, or separate them from the stems and cook them in boiling water until they soften.

Moringa tree leaves - The women break Moringa stalks from the trees, separate the Moringa leaves from the stalks in a methodical and quick manner into a calabash, discard the diseased, damaged or bug ridden leaves, boil water and put the Moringa leaves in. They place a plastic bottle full of butter next to the fire so that it melts. After the leaves soften, they add salt and butter. They serve the food after the water evaporates completely or they pour out the remaining water. Most of the time, the tribesmen will eat the Moringa leaves with some kind of carbohydrate.

Butter - Butter is used for cooking (mainly for the Moringa leaves), for blessings, for softening animal skin, and for applying to the hair to arrange the dreadlocks in combination with reddish clay.

Others - The locals also consume cherry tomatoes fresh from the vine, bananas, white beans, beets, and yogurt they made from cow’s milk. Also, they harvest pumpkins, which are cut and cooked in boiling water or mashed into a puree/ Sometimes they will cook.

Eating Customs Among the Family 
Women and children will eat from one plate and men from another plate. A married man will never eat on the same plate with a married woman, unless it is their own wife, but a married man will eat on the same plate as a single woman. Children and women will get a lesser amount of food compared to men and guests.

Beverages 
The tribesmen drink using calabashes – a type of small hollowed out and dried gourd cut in half lengthwise so that a space is created for liquids.

Water - The tribesmen living in the mountains fill Jerrycans from a distant river and carry them to their homes. They always use water sparingly and use as little as possible. At the same time, they will not skimp – they will prepare a sufficient amount of coffee, wash the dishes after each use and offer water to the guests.

Milk.

Arake - Made from grains: wheat, corn or sorghum. Throughout the day, the tribesmen drink Arake, even in the morning, whether there are guests or not. If there are guests – a full glass is always passed between everyone. This drink is alcoholic.

Alcoholic sorghum beer - The degree of strength depends on the duration of fermentation. For the coming of age ceremonies, for example, the beer will be strong and will ferment for a month.

Method of preparation – First prepare yeast. They take a grain, usually sorghum, barley or wheat, grind it into a powder, place it in water until germination begins. After 3 days, they take it out, put it in a calabash, and cover it. After a week, they take it out to dry in the sun. When dry, they mix sorghum flour with the yeast and water. They make compressed balls the size of a fist that placed on a canvas. The balls transfer to a large pot with a little water on the fire. Every 40 minutes they check if the balls are cooked enough. The cooking time depends on the intensity of the fire, but it will usually take about an hour and a half. After cooking they let the balls cool down. They roll the balls with flour and fermentation begins – for about three days in summer and four days in winter (since fermentation needs heat). They keep the fermented pulp covered and in a shaded place. Upon completion, the beer is ready. The longer the fermentation lasts, the higher the alcohol content.

Serving – Add hot water to the beer paste, mix and drink the liquid. When the hot water runs out, add more.

Coffee from coffee beans - The coffee will be brewed every morning as well as during the day by the women who wakes up alone at first light. When she wakes up, she immediately heats a fire, sits down next to it, pours water from a jar into a pot on the fire with a calabash, boils the water, and covers the pot with the lid. When it boils, she sprinkles several handfuls of coffee husks into the water. Sometimes, salt is added. She takes small calabashes for serving, cleans them with water if necessary, and when the sound of percolation is heard, she pours the coffee into several standard calabashes using a small calabash. She serves first to the owner of the house and then to the rest. The woman will remain seated by the fire in order to fill the calabashes with additional coffee if those present wishes to have more. 

Animal blood - Animal blood is seen by the tribesman as very healthy and gives strength. Most of the time they will drink the blood while it is fresh, sometimes they will cook with it, and sometimes they will mix it with milk. They will always use it and try very carefully to not spill it on the ground.

There are two main ways to collect blood:

 The blood will be taken from a large cow while it is still alive without killing it, using the following method: a person will hold its head with the help by the horn, another person by the tail, a third person will tie a rope around the main artery in its neck, make a small cut with an arrow, collect its blood in a vessel, and when it is looking weak with glassy eyes, the man must close the incision with his fingers and release the rope. The cow is usually alive and released after the procedure. Thin or weak cows can not do this since they will die. This method gives the tribesmen the opportunity to consume blood more often than method B, since they continue to consume the same cow’s blood over and over again.
 After slaughtering the animals, the members of the tribe will drink their blood. One person cuts the main artery in the neck and another person collects the spilled blood in a calabash. The man with the knife, alone or with the help of another person, will tilt the animal. They will mix the blood in the calabash quickly with a stick and remove clots with the hand. Afterwards, the guest of honor or the family will have a drink.

Honey tea - They mix coffee from coffee beans with large quantities of fresh honeycombs from the beehive and drink. This drink will mostly be used as a form of hospitality to guests.

Herbal Remedies 
Karko (the mother of witchdoctors) - A plant with magical properties, it is a common ingredeint among witch doctors.

Gaye Tsamate - Tobacco (in the Tsamai language) is especially used to curse people.

Incense - The witch doctors burn incense in the morning. According to their belief, when a person is dying he can be saved by a spell accompanied by a bite of incense.

Animal Virtues, Medical-Spiritual Medicine 
Ara – This is the name of the treatment that treats babies sick with typhus. They will be treated by killing a goat, sheep, or rooster (depending on the typhus), removing the intestines, and immediately applying them to the baby’s face several times while they are still warm from the animal’s body. The treatment has that name because “ara” is a plant that is yellow inside – in a similar way the locals identify the typhoid disease with yellow feces.

Indigestion – the locals believe that indigestion is caused by problems with the patient’s bile, so he will consume bile from some animal. 

Animal blood - Overcoming a serious illness, or getting stronger for a tough war or hunting, will be done by drinking fresh blood of a live animal because, according to their belief, blood makes a person very strong.

Gender

Men 
The men’s full names are a combination of their first name and their father’s name. However, in practice they will be referred to by their first name and not by their full name.

Men are considered to be more well respected, then women and children. This is also expressed when eating. Men will consume food first, and women and children will get the leftovers in traditional families. Also, the men will usually drink more alcohol than the women. If there are guests, the men will go to bed much later than the women. The men will help with certain household chores, when there are “manly” chores, such as slaughtering animals.

References

External links
Article about Tsamai by Dave Stamboulis
Photo of young Tsamai girl by Dave Stamboulis
Photo of Tsamai men by Dave Stamboulis
Article about Tsamai
Photo of Tsamai woman

I

Ethnic groups in Ethiopia
Cushitic-speaking peoples